The 1982 Grand Prix d'Automne was the 76th edition of the Paris–Tours cycle race and was held on 10 October 1982. The race started in Blois and finished in Chaville. The race was won by Jean-Luc Vandenbroucke.

General classification

References

1982 in French sport
1982
Grand Prix d'Automne
1982 Super Prestige Pernod